System Sensor is a company headquartered in St. Charles, Illinois, dedicated to the research, development and manufacture of fire protection equipment. System Sensor is a part of the Honeywell Life Safety Group.

History 
System Sensor was founded in 1984  to address the requirements of exclusive industry fire alarm products. One of their first products was the MASS sounder series of notification appliances, which came with System Sensor in 1984. Shortly after, in the early 1990s, System Sensor came out with MASS ADA sounders, with a horizontal strobe. In 1997, System Sensor introduced the SpectrAlert, and the MASS was discontinued shortly thereafter. As of November 5, 2006, System Sensor discontinued the SpectrAlert, replacing it with the SpectrAlert Advance, which has a reputation for how loud it is on the highest volume. Another notable product line from System Sensor is their i3 line of both 2 and 4 wire smoke detectors, first released in the early 2000s. System Sensor was acquired by Honeywell in the 2000s and currently manufactures fire protection devices, flow switches for fire suppression systems and climate control products. In 2017, the company announced the L-Series, which claims to save energy, installation time, and money. The L series used the same horn as the Spectralert Advance. The L series can hold different covers and colored lenses so the device can be used for more than just fire alarm service. On February 12, 2020, System Sensor announced that they had discontinued most of their SpectrAlert wall or ceiling mount horn strobes and all of the horn-only devices, chimes, and chime strobes, and were replaced with their L series counterparts. The remaining SpectrAlert notification appliances are outdoor horn strobes. System Sensor recently released its  Low-Frequency L-Series devices. They have the same LF sounder, however they also have the functionality to do Temporal 4 coding, for Carbon Monoxide (CO) operations, and like the other products in the L-Series lineup, the LF version also consumes low energy as well.

Distribution partners 
Mircom is the largest private distribution partner of System Sensor in the world.

See also 
 Heat detector
 First Alert
 Insteon

References

External links 
 

Honeywell
Companies established in 1984
Fire detection and alarm companies